is a Japanese stage, film and television actress. A graduate of the Haiyuza Theatre Company, she gave her film debut in Tadashi Imai's Tower of Lilies (1953) before becoming a contract player at the Nikkatsu film studios. She appeared in almost 100 films of directors like Shōhei Imamura, Masahiro Shinoda and Masaki Kobayashi.

She received the Blue Ribbon Award for Best Supporting Actress for her performance in the 1958 Endless Desire. In 1997 she was awarded a Medal of Honor with Purple Ribbon and in 2004 the Order of the Rising Sun.

Roles

References

External links
 

Japanese actresses
Living people
People from Tokyo
Actresses from Tokyo
People from Minato
1932 births
Recipients of the Medal with Purple Ribbon
Recipients of the Order of the Rising Sun, 4th class